Ralph M. Crystal is an American psychologist, professor and author, currently the Wallace Charles Hill Professor of Rehabilitation Education at University of Kentucky, and his books have been collected by libraries worldwide.

References

Living people
University of Kentucky faculty
21st-century American psychologists
Year of birth missing (living people)